Riolunato is a comune (municipality) in the Province of Modena in the Italian region Emilia-Romagna, located about  southwest of Bologna and about  southwest of Modena. It is overlooked from the south by the Monte Cimone.

Riolunato borders the following municipalities: Fiumalbo, Frassinoro, Lama Mocogno, Montecreto, Palagano, Pievepelago, Sestola.

Traditions
"Maggio delle Ragazze" (May of the girls). The event takes place every three years in two different moments. The first during the night between 30 April and 1 May, the second usually the second Sunday of May. During the first part the young men of the village sing traditional refrains (hymns to spring and youth) in order to wish a good season of prosperity and happiness.

Twin towns
 Tórshavn, Faroe Islands

See also
Groppo (Riolunato)

References

External links

Cities and towns in Emilia-Romagna